The Omotic languages are a group of languages spoken in southwestern Ethiopia, in the Omo River region. The Ge'ez script is used to write some of the Omotic languages, the Latin script for some others. They are fairly agglutinative and have complex tonal systems (for example, the Bench language). The languages have around 6.2 million speakers. The group is generally classified as belonging to the Afroasiatic language family, but this is disputed by some.

Four separate "Omotic" groups are accepted by Glottolog 4.0 and Güldemann (2018): Ta-Ne-Omotic, Dizoid (Maji), Mao, and Aroid ("South Omotic").

Languages
The North and South Omotic branches ("Nomotic" and "Somotic") are universally recognized, with some dispute as to the composition of North Omotic. The primary debate is over the placement of the Mao languages. Bender (2000) classifies Omotic languages as follows:
South Omotic / Aroid (Hamer-Banna, Aari, Dime, Karo)
North Omotic / Non-Aroid
Mao
Bambassi
West Mao (Hozo, Seze, Ganza)
Dizoid (Dizi, Sheko, Nayi)
Gonga–Gimojan
Gonga/Kefoid (Boro, Anfillo, Kafa, Shekkacho)
Gimojan
Yemsa
Ometo–Gimira
Bench
Chara
Ometo languages

Apart from terminology, this differs from Fleming (1976) in including the Mao languages, whose affiliation had originally been controversial, and in abolishing the "Gimojan" group. There are also differences in the subclassification of Ometo, which is not covered here.

Hayward (2003)
Hayward (2003) separates out the Mao languages as a third branch of Omotic and breaks up Ometo–Gimira:

South Omotic
Mao
North Omotic
Dizoid
Ta–Ne languages
Gonga
Gimojan
Yemsa
Bench
Ometo–Chara

Blench (2006)
Blench (2006) gives a more agnostic classification:

South Omotic
North Omotic
Mao
Dizoid
Gonga (Kefoid)
Yem
Gimira
Ometo (?Chara)

Bosha† is unclassified; Ethnologue lists it as a dialect of Kafa but notes it may be a distinct language.

Classification
Omotic is generally considered the most divergent branch of the Afroasiatic languages. Greenberg (1963) had classified it as the Western branch of Cushitic. Fleming (1969) argued that it should instead be classified as an independent branch of Afroasiatic, a view which Bender (1971) established to most linguists' satisfaction, though a few linguists maintain the West Cushitic position or that only South Omotic forms a separate branch, with North Omotic remaining part of Cushitic. Blench (2006) notes that Omotic shares honey-related vocabulary with the rest of Afroasiatic but not cattle-related vocabulary, suggesting that the split occurred before the advent of pastoralism. A few scholars have raised doubts that the Omotic languages are part of the Afroasiatic language family at all, and Theil (2006) proposes that Omotic be treated as an independent family. However, the general consensus, based primarily on morphological evidence, is that membership in Afroasiatic is well established.

Glottolog
Hammarström, et al. in Glottolog does not consider Omotic to be a unified group, and also does not consider any of the "Omotic" groups to be part of the Afroasiatic phylum. Glottolog accepts the following as independent language families.

Ta-Ne-Omotic
Dizoid (Maji)
Mao
Aroid (Ari-Banna; "South Omotic")

These four families are also accepted by Güldemann (2018), who similarly doubts the validity of Omotic as a unified group.

Reconstruction
Bender (1987: 33–35) reconstructs the following proto-forms for Proto-Omotic and Proto-North Omotic, the latter which is considered to have descended from Proto-Omotic.

Comparative vocabulary
Sample basic vocabulary of 40 Omotic languages from Blažek (2008):

See also
Languages of Ethiopia

Notes

Sources cited 
Bender, M. Lionel. 2000. Comparative Morphology of the Omotic Languages. Munich: LINCOM.
Fleming, Harold. 1976. Omotic overview. In The Non-Semitic Languages of Ethiopia, ed. by M. Lionel Bender, pp. 299–323. East Lansing, MI: Michigan State University.
Newman, Paul. 1980. The classification of Chadic within Afroasiatic. Universitaire Pers Leiden.

General Omotic bibliography 
Bender, M. L. 1975. Omotic: a new Afroasiatic language family. (University Museum Series, 3.) Carbondale, IL: Southern Illinois University.
Blench, Roger. 2006. Archaeology, Language, and the African Past. AltaMira Press
Hayward, Richard J., ed. 1990. Omotic Language Studies. London: School of Oriental and African Studies.
Hayward, Richard J. 2003. Omotic: the "empty quarter" of Afroasiatic linguistics. In Research in Afroasiatic Grammar II: selected papers from the fifth conference on Afroasiatic languages, Paris 2000, ed. by Jacqueline Lecarme, pp. 241–261. Amsterdam: John Benjamins.
Lamberti, Marcello. 1991. Cushitic and its classification. Anthropos 86(4/6):552-561.
Zaborski, Andrzej. 1986. Can Omotic be reclassified as West Cushitic? In Gideon Goldenberg, ed., Ethiopian Studies: Proceedings of the 6th International Conference pp. 525–530. Rotterdam: Balkema.

External links
Is Omotic Afro-Asiatic? by Rolf Theil

 
Agglutinative languages
Afroasiatic languages
Languages of Ethiopia
Proposed language families